Jack Grassel (born September 3, 1948) is an American jazz guitarist, teacher, and author from Milwaukee, Wisconsin.

Career 

With a family to support, Grassel turned to teaching music and playing jazz locally. He worked with Rosemary Clooney, Slide Hampton, Stanley Jordan, Ed Thigpen, and Nancy Wilson. He created the Occupational Music degree program at Milwaukee Area Technical College and wrote the books Big Ax and Super Ax. He formed Frozen Sky Records. As a result of the first two records of his compositions "Magic Cereal" and "If You're Too Crazy", he was featured in the New Talent section of Guitar Player magazine and became a contributing writer.

He later invented an instrument he named the "SuperAx" which contained both guitar and bass guitar strings. His friend, guitarist Kirk Tatnall, built one, too, and they recorded the album Live at the Uptowner with their hybrid instruments.

The Hofner guitar company hired Grassel to record a promotional album, Guitar Smoke.

In 2000, readers of Guitar One magazine voted Grassel "one of the 10 best guitarists in America." He married vocalist Jill Jensen, and they recorded two albums: It's About the Music.

Discography 
 Snow People
Jack 2015
El Refugio
Jack and Jill Jazz
It's About the Music
The Adventures of Jack and Hans
Live @ The Carleton Grange
Ghost Ridge
Guitar Smoke
Seems Like Dreams
Bob and Jack, What We Do
Two Guys with Guitars
Matrix
Live At The Uptowner
Magic Cereal
Christmas Presence
Music Lingo
If You're Too Crazy
Thunder Stones
Tracks (with Mel Rhyne)

Bibliography
 1974  Guitar Seeds
 1976  Monster Chops
 1992  Power Practicing
 1994  Big Ax
 1996  Super Ax
 1998  Jazz Guitar Favorites
 1998  Jazz Guitar Classics
 1998  Jazz Guitar Standards
 2002    Jazz Rhythm Guitar
 2004  Brain Training
 2004  131 Axercises
 2008  70 Jazz Compositions
 2008  Top 20 Jazz Guitar Lessons (DVD)
 2020 The Reharmonized Real Book

References 

1948 births
Living people
Milwaukee Area Technical College people
American jazz guitarists
20th-century American guitarists